Xi'erqi station  is an interchange station between Line 13 and the Changping Line on the Beijing Subway. The station has relocated to a new location several hundreds meters north on December 25, 2010 to ease transfer between the two lines when the new Changping Line opened, and the original station was then defunct, but was not demolished until August 2020. The new building a light membrane white covering was designed by Atelier Li Xinggang. The station is extremely congested with 13,000 people per hour transferring between the station's two lines during peak periods. A viral video filmed at this station showing rush hour crowds attempting to board the overcrowded trains was posted on YouTube in 2013.

Station layout 
Both the line 13 and Changping line stations have 2 side platforms. The line 13 platforms are on ground level, while the Changping line platforms are elevated, which means that the Changping line platforms are above the line 13 platforms.

Exits 
There are 5 exits, lettered A1, A2, B1, B2, and B3. Exits A1 and B3 are accessible.

Gallery

References

External links

Beijing Subway stations in Haidian District
Railway stations in China opened in 2002